Wilson Phillips is an American pop group formed in Los Angeles in 1989. The group consists of Carnie Wilson and Wendy Wilson, the daughters of Brian Wilson of the Beach Boys, and Chynna Phillips, the daughter of John and Michelle Phillips of the Mamas & the Papas.

Their 1990 eponymous debut album sold over 10 million copies worldwide and included five major US hit singles, four of which went Top 10 (three of those to number one) on the Billboard Hot 100. In 1990, the group won the Billboard Music Award for Hot 100 Single of the Year for their song "Hold On", and was nominated for five Grammy Awards and two American Music Awards.

History

1989–1991: Formation and Wilson Phillips
The Wilson sisters and Phillips grew up together in the Los Angeles area in the 1970s and 1980s. The three shared a love of music, and developed their singing and vocal harmonies. In 1989, the trio landed a deal with SBK Records.
All three are the offspring of prominent musicians; Chynna is the daughter of John and Michelle Phillips of The Mamas & the Papas, and Carnie and Wendy are the daughters of Brian Wilson of The Beach Boys and Marilyn Rovell of The Honeys. Wilson Phillips released their debut album, Wilson Phillips, in 1990. Their debut single, "Hold On," hit number one on the U.S. Billboard Hot 100 chart on June 9, 1990. The single was also number one  on the US Billboard Adult Contemporary and became a hit in several other countries; peaking at number two in Australia, number six in the UK, number seven in Ireland, number 10 in Sweden, and  number 15 in the Netherlands, Germany, and Switzerland. The single also won Wilson Phillips the Billboard Music Award for Hot 100 Single of the Year for 1990. The second single, "Release Me", spent two weeks at number one. Their third single, "Impulsive, became another top ten hit, peaking at number four on the Hot 100, while fourth single "You're in Love" hit number one in the US for one week. The fifth single, "The Dream Is Still Alive", peaked at number twelve on the Hot 100.

In 1991, the group contributed a version of the song "Daniel" to the tribute album Two Rooms: Celebrating the Songs of Elton John & Bernie Taupin. While not released as a single, it peaked at number seven on the US Adult Contemporary chart due to strong airplay. Their single "You're in Love" was released that same year, which scored as a number one (and to date, their last top ten) pop single. In 1992, Wilson Phillips also made history as Billboard declared their debut album, at that time, the best-selling album of all time by an all female act; the album peaked at number two on the Billboard 200 album chart, while it had sales of 5 million copies in the US, with a total of 8 million copies sold worldwide. That achievement, however, was later surpassed with the 1996 album Spice by the Spice Girls.

1992–1993: Shadows and Light and breakup
In June 1992, Wilson Phillips released their second album, Shadows and Light. The album was deeply personal and adopted a more serious tone, with tracks exploring issues such as child abuse ("Where Are You") and their estrangement from their fathers ("Flesh and Blood", "All the Way From New York"). The first single, "You Won't See Me Cry," peaked at number 20 in the US and number 18 in the UK, the first time they had a higher-ranking single in the UK than in the US. The single gave them a hit in the US and the UK, and saw the album peak at number four on the US Billboard 200, and it was eventually certified platinum in the US. However, the second single "Give It up" became a moderate hit, peaking at number thirty, and third single "Flesh and Blood" failed to crack the Hot 100. Shortly after, the group decided to break up, departing just after their second album. Chynna Phillips announced plans for a solo career, however, the group performed the US national anthem in a baseball stadium.

Less than a year after the release of their second album, the group had gone their separate ways. In 1993, Wendy and Carnie Wilson released the Christmas album Hey Santa!, a collection of classic Christmas songs which included an original song, "Hey Santa". In 1995, Chynna Phillips released a solo album, Naked and Sacred. Also in 1995, Carnie went on to host her own short-lived syndicated television talk show titled Carnie! In 1997, Carnie and Wendy, along with their father Brian Wilson, released  the album The Wilsons and the single "Monday Without You." Capitol Records released a Wilson Phillips Greatest Hits album in 2000.

On March 29, 2001, the group reunited to perform The Beach Boys' song "You're So Good to Me" at a tribute show to Brian Wilson held at New York's Radio City Music Hall. Chynna Phillips also dedicated the performance to her father John Phillips, who had died a few days earlier.

2004: First reunion
Wilson Phillips reunited in 2004 to release a new album, California, a collection of cover songs. A single, "Go Your Own Way," a song originally recorded by Fleetwood Mac, peaked at number 13 on the US Billboard Adult Contemporary chart. The album fared moderately well on the charts, debuting and peaking at number 35 on the US Billboard 200 chart with 31,000 copies sold in its first week of release. In New Zealand, the album reached the top 10 and amassed gold status after "Go Your Own Way" topped the country's adult contemporary radio chart. The group departed once again.

2010–present: Second reunion
On October 12, 2010, Wilson Phillips released a Christmas album, Christmas in Harmony. The album yielded a single, "I Wish It Could Be Christmas Everyday," a cover of the popular seasonal tune that first was a hit in 1973 for English glam-rock band Wizzard. The group had a cameo appearance in the film Bridesmaids (2011) and performed "Hold On". Bandmember Chynna was a contestant on season 13 of ABC's Dancing With the Stars and explained that "Hold On" was written by herself, Carnie, and Wendy about Chynna's recovery from drug and alcohol addiction. Chynna made it to week four of the competition.

On March 20, 2012, the group appeared on QVC to promote their release Dedicated, a studio album composed of covers of songs by both The Beach Boys and The Mamas and the Papas. On April 3, 2012, the group released Dedicated, which peaked at number 29 on the US Billboard 200 chart. The trio appeared in their own reality show, Wilson Phillips: Still Holding On, which debuted on TV Guide Network in April 2012. In 2015, Wilson Phillips contributed backup vocals to the song "FourFiveSeconds" by Rihanna, Paul McCartney, and Kanye West for Rihanna's eighth studio album.

In July 2016, Wilson Phillips reunited and performed on ABC's Greatest Hits. In 2017, the group performed on the season finale of NBC's The New Celebrity Apprentice.

In 2022, Wilson Phillips competed in season eight of The Masked Singer as the "Lambs". Chynna portrayed the Lamb with the name "Blueberry", Carnie portrayed the Lamb with the name "Rose", and Wendy portrayed the Lamb with the name "Lilac". They became the first group act to advance to the finale and finished as the runners-up to Amber Riley as "Harp". As an encore, they performed "Hold On".

In November 2022, the group released a cover version of Harry Styles’s song “Boyfriends”.

Discography

Studio albums

Compilation albums

Singles

Other charted songs

Awards and nominations

References

External links
 

 
American vocal groups
American pop girl groups
Columbia Records artists
Musical groups from Los Angeles
Musical groups established in 1989
SBK Records artists